Franz Hartwig (born 1986) is a German actor.

Life 
He was born in Dresden.He lives in Berlin.

Selected filmography 

 2019: Der Pass (TV series) as Gregor Ansbach
 2021:  (TV film) as Georg Kelz

References

External links 
 
  
  
  Franz Hartwig – Vita; Schaubühne Berlin
  Franz Hartwig on Agentur Hoerstermann
  Claudia Tieschky: Franz Hartwig im Porträt: Beiläufig bedeutend; Süddeutsche Zeitung vom 1. Mai 2019

Living people
1986 births
German film actors
German male stage actors
People from Dresden